Cheung Chuk Shan College is an aided, whole-day co-educational grammar secondary school founded in Hong Kong in 1969 by a group of philanthropists of the Five Districts Business Welfare Association.

The School is named after Cheung Chuk Shan (1882 – 1936), a merchant from Siyi area of Southern Guangdong in the early 20th century.

Significant Events of the School

Class Structure
There are 27 classes in the School and enrollment remains steady at around 900 students. The number of S1 classes is altered between 4 and 5 on alternate school years since there would be inadequate space to accommodate 30 classes if the School accepted 5 S1 classes every year.

Curriculum
Since its establishment, the School has been adopting English as the medium of instruction. Except Chinese Language, Chinese Literature, Chinese History and Putonghua, all subjects are taught in English this school year.

Subjects offered to students:

Facilities
Different amenities can be found within the eight-storey building of the School. There are 26 classrooms, 4 science laboratories, a multimedia learning centre, a computer room, a geography room, a music room, an art room, a home economics room, a needlework room, a library, an assembly hall, an outdoor playground, a gymnasium with a bouldering wall and 2 teaching rooms. The assembly hall, all classrooms and special rooms are air-conditioned.

Incorporated Management Committee
Headed by Mr. Chan Kam Toi, the Incorporated Management Committee (IMC) comprises 15 members and is responsible for setting the general direction of development for the School and monitoring its operation.

Members of the IMC

List of Supervisors
1.	Mr. Cheung Yok Luen, MBE, JP (1969 – 1979)
2.	Mrs. Irene Cheung Yok Luen, MBE, JP (1979 – 2006)
3.	Mr. Chan Kam Toi (2006 - )

List of Principals
1.	Mr. Law Chung Hung (1969 – 1976)
2.	Mr. Leung Sau Chi, BH, JP (1976 – 2003)
3.	Mr. Yuen Tze Lam (2003 – 2013)
4.	Mr. Au Chun Keung (2013 - )

Teaching Staff
In the school year 2015 – 16, there are 61 teachers and 60 of them are graduates of whom 23 are holders of a master's degree and 1 is a graduate of College of Education. 95% of the teachers have already received professional training.

Extra-curricular Activities
The School provides multifarious activities and the Free Membership Scheme encourages students to participate in activities organized by different interest groups and clubs. In addition, the School and the Cheung Chuk Shan College Alumni Foundation Fund offer different awards to students with outstanding participation records in extra-curricular activities.

Student Performance
In 1997, the school was the top performer of all arts candidates in the Hong Kong Certificate of Education Examination (HKCEE), a student was awarded the Sir Edward Youde Memorial Medal. In 2002, a student procured 10 distinctions in the HKCEE. In the 2016 Hong Kong Diploma of Secondary Education Examination, impressive individual performance of a number of students was recorded, the best student securing 5 Level 5**, 1 Level 5* and 1 Level 5. The university admission rate is much higher than the average in Hong Kong.

Students of the School also participate actively in extra-curricular activities, capturing various awards and prizes in the academic, aesthetic, sports and service domains. The Red Cross Youth Team of the School is especially heartening in its development by having been Overall Champion in the Red Cross Outstanding Youth Team Competition for 6 consecutive years (2010 – 16).

Notable alumni

Politics

Law

Finance

Education

Fashion

Social Affairs

Mass Media

Sport

Entertainment

References

External links

Cheung Chuk Shan College
Parent-Teacher Association of Cheung Chuk Shan College 
Old Students' Association of Cheung Chuk Shan College 
Cheung Chuk Shan College Alumni Foundation Fund
Cheung Chuk Shan College Alumni Overseas Link

Eastern District, Hong Kong
Educational institutions established in 1969
Secondary schools in Hong Kong
1969 establishments in Hong Kong